The Man Without a Heart is a 1924 American silent drama film directed by Burton L. King and starring Kenneth Harlan, Jane Novak and David Powell.

Cast
 Kenneth Harlan as Rufus Asher
 Jane Novak as Barbara Wier
 David Powell as Edmund Hyde
 Faire Binney as Linda Hyde
 Bradley Barker as Hugh Langley
 Tommy Tremaine as Margo Hume
 Mary McCall as Fanny Van Dyke
 Muriel Ruddell as Jane Wilkins
 Tom Blake as Pat O'Toole

References

Bibliography
 Munden, Kenneth White. The American Film Institute Catalog of Motion Pictures Produced in the United States, Part 1. University of California Press, 1997.

External links
 

1924 films
1924 drama films
1920s English-language films
American silent feature films
Silent American drama films
American black-and-white films
Films directed by Burton L. King
1920s American films